Whyteleafe South railway station serves part of the suburban village of Whyteleafe in the district of Tandridge, Surrey, England.

There are three railway stations in the village, the others being Whyteleafe, and Upper Warlingham on the Oxted Line. This station was named Warlingham until 11 June 1956; its single-storey main buildings are on the Down side. The narrow gabled station house still exists.

Services 

All services at Whyteleafe South are operated by Southern using  EMUs.

The typical off-peak service in trains per hour is:

 2 tph to 

Up until September 2022 there were additional off-peak services to London Bridge via Norbury and Tulse Hill.

References

External links

History of the branch line

Railway stations in Surrey
Former South Eastern Railway (UK) stations
Railway stations in Great Britain opened in 1856
Railway stations served by Govia Thameslink Railway